{{DISPLAYTITLE:C17H17N3O3}}
The molecular formula C17H17N3O3 (molar mass: 311.335 g/mol) may refer to:

 Imazaquin
 (R)-3-Nitrobiphenyline

Molecular formulas